Anania aurea is a moth in the family Crambidae. It was described by Arthur Gardiner Butler in 1875. It is found in South Africa, where it has been recorded from KwaZulu-Natal.

References

Endemic moths of South Africa
Moths described in 1875
Pyraustinae
Moths of Africa